It's Real is the final third album by By All Means in 1992 on Motown Records. The album includes the hits "Love Lies" and "Say You'll Never Leave Me," as well as the band's final stateside hit, "The Feeling I Get."

Track listing

References
 [ Allmusic]
 Discogs

External links
 
 It's Real at Discogs
 Facebook Page
 Soulwalking page

1992 albums
Motown albums